The Nomenclature of Territorial Units for Statistics (NUTS) is developed by Eurostat, and employed in both Portugal and the entire European Union for statistical purposes. The NUTS branch extends from NUTS1, NUTS2 and NUTS3 regions, with the complementary LAU (Local Administrative Units) sub-categorization being used to differentiate the local areas, of trans-national importance.

Developed by Eurostat and implemented in 1998, the Nomenclature of Territorial Units for Statistics (NUTS) regions, which comprises three levels of the Portuguese territory, are instrumental in European Union's Structural Fund delivery mechanisms. The standard was developed by the European Union and extensively used by national governments, Eurostat and other EU bodies for statistical and policy matters. Until 4 November 2002, the Sistema Estatístico Nacional (SEN) used a NUTS codification system that was distinct from the Eurostat system. With the enactment of Decree Law 244/2002 (5 November 2002), published in the Diário da República, this system was abandoned in order to harmonize the national system with that of Eurostat.

Subdivisions 
The NUTS system subdivides the nation into three levels: NUTS I, NUTS II and NUTS III. In some European partners, as is the case with Portugal, a complementary hierarchy, respectively LAU I and LAU II (posteriorly referred to as NUTS IV and NUTS V) is employed. The LAU, or Local Administrative Units, in the Portuguese context pertains to the 308 municipalities (LAU I) and 3092 civil parishes (LAU II) respectively. In the broadest sense, the NUTS hierarchy, while they may follow some of the  borders (municipal or parish) diverge in their delineation.

Changes NUTS 2-3 (1986—2013)

NUTS I

The first and broadest subdivision of Portugal is between continental Portugal and the two autonomous regions of the Azores and Madeira.

NUTS II

Although the districts are still the most socially relevant subdivision, their function is being phased in favour of locally oriented regional units, and regions are growing in importance. Portugal is divided into five regions, administered by the Commissions for Coordination and Regional Development in continental Portugal, plus the two autonomous regions that are their own NUTS II regions.

NUTS III

The seven regions of Portugal are likewise subdivided into 25 subregions that, from 2015, represent the 2 metropolitan areas, the 21 intermunicipal communities and the 2 autonomous regions. Therefore, since the 2013 revision (enforced in 2015), the Portuguese subregions have a statutory and administrative relevance.

The two autonomous regions in the Atlantic, correspond to their own NUTS I, II and III categories.

NUTS Codes
{| class="wikitable"
! width="60px" |Code
! width="200px" |NUTS 1
! width="60px" |Code
! width="200px" |NUTS 2
! width="60px" |Code
! width="250px" |NUTS 3
|-
| rowspan="23" align="center" |PT1
| rowspan="23" align="center" |Continente
| rowspan="8" align="center" |PT11
| rowspan="8" align="center" |Norte
| align="center" |PT111
| style="padding-left: 7px" |Alto Minho
|-
| align="center" |PT112
| style="padding-left: 7px" |Cávado
|-
| align="center" |PT119
| style="padding-left: 7px" |Ave
|-
| align="center" |PT11A
| style="padding-left: 7px" |Área Metropolitana do Porto
|-
| align="center" |PT11B
| style="padding-left: 7px" |Alto Tâmega
|-
| align="center" |PT11C
| style="padding-left: 7px" |Tâmega e Sousa
|-
| align="center" |PT11D
| style="padding-left: 7px" |Douro
|-
| align="center" |PT11E
| style="padding-left: 7px" |Terras de Trás-os-Montes
|-
| align="center" |PT15
| align="center" |Algarve
| align="center" |PT150
| style="padding-left: 7px" |Algarve
|-
| rowspan="8" align="center" |PT16
| rowspan="8" align="center" |Centro
| align="center" |PT16B
| style="padding-left: 7px" |Oeste
|-
| align="center" |PT16D
| style="padding-left: 7px" |Região de Aveiro
|-
| align="center" |PT16E
| style="padding-left: 7px" |Região de Coimbra
|-
| align="center" |PT16F
| style="padding-left: 7px" |Região de Leiria
|-
| align="center" |PT16G
| style="padding-left: 7px" |Viseu Dão-Lafões
|-
| align="center" |PT16H
| style="padding-left: 7px" |Beira Baixa
|-
| align="center" |PT16I
| style="padding-left: 7px" |Médio Tejo
|-
| align="center" |PT16J
| style="padding-left: 7px" |Beiras e Serra da Estrela
|-
| align="center" |PT17
| align="center" |Área Metropolitana de Lisboa
| align="center" |PT170
| style="padding-left: 7px" |Área Metropolitana de Lisboa
|-
| rowspan="5" align="center" |PT18
| rowspan="5" align="center" |Alentejo
| align="center" |PT181
| style="padding-left: 7px" |Alentejo Litoral
|-
| align="center" |PT184
| style="padding-left: 7px" |Baixo Alentejo
|-
| align="center" |PT185
| style="padding-left: 7px" |Lezíria do Tejo
|-
| align="center" |PT186
| style="padding-left: 7px" |Alto Alentejo
|-
| align="center" |PT187
| style="padding-left: 7px" |Alentejo Central
|-
| align="center" |PT2
| align="center" |Região Autónoma dos Açores
| align="center" |PT20
| align="center" |Região Autónoma dos Açores
| align="center" |PT200
| style="padding-left: 7px" |Região Autónoma dos Açores
|-
| align="center" |PT3
| align="center" |Região Autónoma da Madeira
| align="center" |PT30
| align="center" |Região Autónoma da Madeira
| align="center" |PT300
| style="padding-left: 7px" |Região Autónoma da Madeira
|}

LAUs

Municipalities and civil parishes were at NUTS IV and V levels, but these nomenclature units have been abolished and substituted by LAUs: the municipality is classified as LAU 1, while the civil parish is LAU level 2. Below the NUTS levels, the two LAU (Local Administrative Unit) levels are:

The LAU codes of Portugal can be downloaded at:

See also
 Administrative divisions of Portugal
 ISO 3166-2 codes of Portugal
 FIPS region codes of Portugal
 List of Portuguese regions by Human Development Index
 Subdivisions of Portugal

References

Sources
 Hierarchical list of the Nomenclature of territorial units for statistics - NUTS and the Statistical regions of Europe
 Overview map of EU Countries - NUTS level 1
 PORTUGAL - NUTS level 2
 PORTUGAL - NUTS level 3
 Correspondence between the NUTS levels and the national administrative units
 List of current NUTS codes
 Download current NUTS codes (ODS format)
 Regions of Portugal, Statoids.com
 Municipalities of Portugal, Statoids.com
 Regiões de Portugal, LOCAL.PT

Portugal
Nuts